Quality Hotel 33 is a hotel in the Nordic Choice Hotels placed by the National Road 163 number 33 at Økern in Oslo. The name comes of the address.

The hotel is placed in the former administration building of the Standard Telephones and Cables, drawn by architect Erling Viksjø. The building was refurbished to become a hotel in 2007.

Gallery

References

External links 
 The website of hotel 33

Hotels in Oslo
Hotels established in 2007
2007 establishments in Norway